Airdrie is a city in Alberta, Canada within the Calgary Region. It is located north of Calgary within the Calgary–Edmonton Corridor at the intersection of Queen Elizabeth II Highway (Highway 2) and Highway 567.

The City of Airdrie is part of the Calgary census metropolitan area and a member municipality of the Calgary Metropolitan Region Board (CMRB). The city is surrounded by Rocky View County.

As of the 2021 Canadian census Airdrie has a population of 74,100, making it the 5th largest city in Alberta, after Calgary, Edmonton, Lethbridge, and Red Deer.

History 
Airdrie was first established as a railway siding in 1889 during the construction of the Calgary and Edmonton Railway, named for Airdrie, Scotland.  Airdrie originated as a stopping point for steam trains next to Nose Creek. Only railway buildings existed until 1901 when the first farmhouse and barn was built, followed by a post office and store in that same year.  The village of Airdrie was incorporated in 1909.  The Nose Creek Valley Museum offers an overview of Airdrie's past and history.

Geography 
Recent annexation of land by Airdrie to the south, coupled with recent expansion of Calgary's city limits in July 2007, have placed the two cities' boundaries within only a few kilometres of each other.

Neighbourhoods 
Airdrie is divided into four civic addressing quadrants. As of the 2012 census, the City of Airdrie recognized the following neighbourhoods, not including rural and annexation land.

 Airdrie Meadows
 Bayside/Bayspring
 Big Springs
 Canals
 Coopers Crossing
 Downtown
 East Lake Industrial
 Edgewater
 Edmonton Trail
 Fairways
 Highland
 Hillcrest
 Jensen
 King's Heights
 Luxstone
 Meadowbrook
 Midtown
 Morningside
 Old Town
 Prairie Springs
 Ravenswood
 Reunion
 Ridgegate
 Sagewood
 Silver Creek
 Stonegate
 Summerhill
 Sun Ridge
 The Village
 Thorburn
 Waterstone
 Williamstown
 Willow Brook
 Windsong
 Woodside
 Yankee Valley Crossing

Demographics 

In 2021, 74.7% of residents were white/European, 20.4% were visible minorities and 4.9% were Indigenous.

46.8% of Airdrie residents were Christians, down from 62.1% in 2011. 18.4% were Catholic, 11.3% were Protestant, and 11.8% were Christian n.o.s. 5.3% were other Christian denominations or Christian-related traditions, including 1.3% Latter Day Saints believers. 45.9% were non-religious or secular, up from 35.5% in 2011. 7.2% of the population belonged to other religions, up from 2.3% in 2011. The largest non-Christian religions were Islam (3.0%), Sikhism (2.1%) and Hinduism (1.0%).

Religion

Arts and culture 
Nose Creek Regional Park hosts the annual Airdrie Festival of Lights during the Christmas season, usually lasting for the whole month of December. Other annual festivals include the Canada Day Parade and the Airdrie Pro Rodeo. Airdrie's primary cultural venues include the Nose Creek Valley Museum and the Bert Church Live Theatre. Bert Chruch Live Theatre  hosts the Annual Airdrie Mayor's Night of the Arts.

Attractions 
 Nose Creek Park
Nose Creek Park is home to the first monument in Alberta to Philippine National Hero, José Rizal, which was inaugurated in October 2021.
 Nose Creek Valley Museum
 Bert Church Live Theatre
 Iron Horse Park
 Airdrie Festival of Lights
 Airdrie Pro Rodeo
 Airdrie Family Fall Fair

Sports 
Airdrie is the home of several sporting franchises. Major teams include the Knights of Airdrie, a senior men's lacrosse team that plays in the Rocky Mountain Lacrosse League. As well they have a Jr. B level hockey Team, the Airdrie Thunder, that competes in the Heritage Junior B Hockey League, and Team Airdrie, a Jr. C level hockey team that competes in the Calgary Jr. C Hockey League.  They are also home to the CFR Chemical Bisons, a AAA Midget hockey team, playing out of the AMHL (Alberta AAA Midget Hockey League).

Airdrie is home to two competitive swimming clubs, Airdrie Phoenix Swim Club (Airdrie based, https://www.gomotionapp.com/team/abapsc/page/home ) and Nose Creek Swim Association (Calgary based, https://www.teamunify.com/team/canncsa/page/home ) with many athletes reaching provincial championships, and national competitions as well. Both clubs operate in Genesis Place.

Airdrie is also the home of the Airdrie Irish a SR MENS Semi Pro Alberta Football League. The Irish were formed in 2015 and play all home games at Airdrie's Genesis Place in summer months.

There is also a number of competitive junior and amateur sports with the largest being soccer, that call Airdrie home. Airdrie District Soccer Association (ADSA) has over 2000 children between the ages of 3 and 18 registered to its ever-growing program (www.airdriesoccer.com). With Airdrie being one of the fastest-growing cities in Canada, it is also home to eight competitive adult soccer teams playing within the Calgary Soccer Associations competition.

Infrastructure

Transportation 

Airdrie is situated on the Queen Elizabeth II Highway (Highway 2), which links Calgary and Edmonton. Highway 567 provides access to Cochrane to the west and Irricana to the east.

Airdrie is served by the Airdrie Airport, with the closest major airport being the Calgary International Airport.

Airdrie launched the InterCity Express (ICE) in the fall of 2010, connecting Airdrie and Calgary transit hubs by a two-way express bus service. Local bus service is provided by Airdrie Transit.

Education 
Rocky View Schools provides public education in Airdrie, and operates 18  schools in the city:
 A.E. Bowers Elementary School
 Bert Church High School
 C.W. Perry School
 Cooper's Crossing School
 Ecole Airdrie Middle School
 Ecole Edwards Elementary School
 George McDougall High School
 Heloise Lorimer School
 Heron's Crossing School
 Meadowbrook School
 Muriel Clayton Middle School
 Northcott Prairie School
 Nose Creek School
 R.J. Hawkey Elementary School
 Ralph McCall School
 RVS Community Learning Centre
 W.H. Croxford High School
 Windsong Heights School

Calgary Catholic School District operates four schools in Airdrie:
 St. Martin de Porres High School (8-12)
 Good Shepherd School (K-7)
 Our Lady Queen of Peace (K-9)
 St Veronica School (K-7)

Private schools in the city include Airdrie Koinonia Christian School.

Airdrie has one fully francophone school, operated by the FrancoSud school board: École Francophone d’Airdrie (K-12)

Media 
Due to its proximity to Calgary, Airdrie receives radio and television broadcasts from the city (see Media of Calgary). It at present has no local television broadcasters but has a radio station, Air 106.1 FM and an accompanying community internet portal, DiscoverAirdrie.com. The city has two local newspapers, the  Airdrie City View and the Airdrie Echo. A community newsletter, Here's the Scoop, was also published weekly and delivered door to door as part of a larger flyer package throughout the city until July 2020, at which time it was purchased by Airdrie City View. A quarterly magazine, AirdrieLIFE, is also available.

Shopping and services 
Airdrie offers a full slate of resident services, with any services not available in the city being easily obtained nearby Calgary.

The city is served by a number of strip-mall developments, including Tower Lane Mall (a former enclosed shopping centre converted to a strip mall in the late 2000s) and Yankee Valley Crossing. On the city's south end, the Sierra Springs area is seeing the ongoing development of big-box retail, including a Walmart Supercentre and London Drugs. The city's north end includes Real Canadian Superstore and Canadian Tire locations and other major grocery chains such as Sobeys, Canada Safeway and Calgary Co-op are also located in the city.

Airdrie is located immediately north of the hamlet of Balzac, which is the location of the major regional shopping mall CrossIron Mills, which opened in 2009, and its neighbouring retail/business park development. In addition, north Calgary's numerous malls and retail areas are quickly accessible via Hwy. 2 and the extension of Calgary's Métis Trail into the Balzac/CrossIron Mills area.

Sister cities 

 Gwacheon, South Korea since 1997
 Airdrie, North Lanarkshire, Scotland

Notable people 
 

Grant McLean, former mayor

See also 
 List of communities in Alberta
 List of cities in Alberta

Notes

References

External links 

 
1909 establishments in Alberta
Cities in Alberta
Populated places established in 1909